Deh Mansur (also Romanized as Deh Manşūr) is a village in Mokriyan-e Shomali Rural District, in the Central District of Miandoab County, West Azerbaijan Province, Iran. At the 2006 census, its population was 430, in 100 families.

References 

Populated places in Miandoab County